In cricket, a five-wicket haul (also known as a "five–for" or "fifer") refers to a bowler taking five or more wickets in a single innings. This is regarded as a notable achievement, and fewer than 50 bowlers have taken more than 15 five-wicket hauls at international level in their cricketing careers. Richard Hadlee, a retired New Zealand cricketer, took 41 five-wicket hauls during his career in international cricket. A fast bowler who represented his country between 1973 and 1990, Hadlee was described by the BBC as "one of the greatest bowlers the world has seen". Hadlee was named by Wisden as one of their Cricketers of the Year in 1982. In 2009, the International Cricket Council (ICC) inducted him into the ICC Cricket Hall of Fame. Hadlee was the first bowler to take 400 wickets in Test cricket.

Hadlee made his Test debut in 1973 against Pakistan at the Basin Reserve, Wellington. His first Test five-wicket haul came in 1976, against India in a match at the same venue which New Zealand won. In February 1980, he took his first pair of five-wicket hauls in a single match against the West Indies at the Carisbrook, Dunedin. By the end of his career, he had claimed five-wicket hauls in both innings of a match on five occasions. He went on to take ten or more wickets in a match on nine occasions. In Tests, Hadlee was most successful against Australia, with fourteen five-wicket hauls. His best bowling figures in an innings were 9 wickets for 52 runs against the same team at the Brisbane Cricket Ground, in November 1985. He followed up in the second innings of that match with 6 for 71 and achieved his best match figures of 15 for 123 to give New Zealand an innings win.

Having made his One Day International (ODI) debut in February 1973 against Pakistan at the Lancaster Park, Christchurch, Hadlee's first ODI five-wicket haul came in 1980 against India, in a match at the WACA Ground, Perth, which New Zealand lost. His career-best bowling figures in ODI cricket were 5 wickets for 25 runs against Sri Lanka at the County Cricket Ground, Bristol, in June 1983. By the time he retired from international cricket in 1990 after nearly 17 years, Hadlee had taken 36 five-wicket hauls in Test cricket and five in ODIs. As of October 2012, he is second overall among all-time combined five-wicket haul takers, behind Muttiah Muralitharan.

Key

Tests

One Day Internationals

Notes

References

External links
 
 

Hadlee
Hadlee, Richard